Adrián Menéndez Maceiras was the defending champion but lost in the second round to John-Patrick Smith.

Christopher Eubanks won the title after defeating Smith 6–4, 3–6, 7–6(7–4) in the final.

Seeds

Draw

Finals

Top half

Bottom half

References
Main Draw
Qualifying Draw

Torneo Internacional Challenger León - Singles
2018 Singles